Niklas Asker (born 1979) is a Swedish comic book artist, best known for his debut graphic novel Second Thoughts

References

External links

 

1979 births
Living people
Swedish comics artists